Lebogang Mabatle is a South African football defender. She plays for University of Pretoria and the South Africa women's national football team.

Playing career

International
Mabatle represented South Africa at the 2012 Summer Olympics in London.

In September 2014, Mabatle was named to the roster for the 2014 African Women's Championship in Namibia.

References

External links
 
 South Africa player profile

1992 births
Living people
People from Dr JS Moroka Local Municipality
Women's association football defenders
South African women's soccer players
South Africa women's international soccer players